The Ministry of Migration and Asylum is the official government body that oversees migration and asylum policy issues in Greece. It also contributes and implements European policies on Migration. It collaborates with the European Union Agency for Asylum, the International Organization for Migration and the United Nations. It receives funding from the Asylum, Migration and Integration Fund, the Internal Security Fund and the European Recovery and Resilience Fund. The Ministry of Migration and Asylum was established in January 15, 2020. The Ministry of Migration Policy, established in 2016, was abolished on July 8, 2019.

Notis Mitarachi is the Minister of Migration and Asylum and Sofia Voultepsi is the Deputy Minister responsible for issues of social integration

History 
On November 4, 2016, with the Presidential Decree 123/2016, the Ministry of Migration Policy was established from the former Ministry of Interior.
On July 8, 2019, with the Presidential Decree 81/2019, the Ministry of Citizen Protection 
On January 15, 2020, with the Presidential Decree 4/2020, the Ministry of Migration and Asylum was created. The services of the Ministry of Citizen Protection were transferred to the Ministry of Migration and Asylum.
On January 23, 2020, with the Presidential Decree 106/2020 the new organization of the Ministry of Migration and Asylum was formed

Administrative Services

Secretariat-General of Migration Policy 
The General Secretariat of Migration Policy was established in 2010 with Article 1 of the Presidential Decree 11/2010 (16.02.10 Α’15). Following a series of administrative changes, the Secretariat was re-established in 2020 with the Presidential Decree 18/2020 (Α34).The General Secretariat participates in the planning and implementation of national and European policies for migration, oversees international protection policies by examining asylum applications, and promotes the social integration of third-country nationals in Greece.
According to the Presidential Decree 106/2020, the Secretariat-General of Migration Policy oversees the Directorate-General of Migration Policy, the Appeals Authority, Directorate – General for the Coordination and Management of Migration and Home Affairs Funds and the Asylum Service

Secretariat-General for Reception of Asylum Seekers 
The Secretariat-General for Reception of Asylum Seekers was established by the first article of the Presidential Decree 18/2020 (Government Gazette 34/Issue Α’/19-02-2020). The Reception and Identification Service (previously named First Reception Service according to Law 3907/2011) was established with Law Ν.4375/2016 (Government Gazette 51/Issue Α’/ 03-04-2016) and operates under the Secretariat-General for Reception of Asylum Seekers. The Reception and Identification Service is responsible for the reception and identification procedures for third-country nationals who enter Greece without the lawful requirements.

Secretariat Special for the Protection of Unaccompanied Minors 
The Secretariat Special for the Protection of Unaccompanied Minors was established with paragraph 3 of the first article of the Presidential Degree 18/2020. It operates according to Articles 35 and 42 of the Law 4622/2019 and reports to the Deputy Minister of Migration and Asylum. Its mission is to plan, implement and supervise the National Strategy in Greece for the protection of unaccompanied minors. The Secretariat Special also designs and implements all necessary policies and required actions to ensure the protection and well-being of third-country nationals and stateless minors who are unaccompanied or separated from their families.

Secretariat Special for the Coordination of Stakeholders 
The Special Secretariat for the Coordination of Stakeholders was established by paragraph 4 of the first Article of the Presidential Decree 18/2020 and has two main strategic objectives:
 Enable the certification of Legal Entities under Private Law (N.P.I.D.) of Non-Profit and Non-Governmental Organizations (NGOs) and their members who work in Greece, on matters of international protection, migration and social integration.
 Ensure the smooth coexistence between refugees and migrants who are hosted in Accommodation Facilities and Centers of local communities.

Former Ministers

Ministers of Migration Policy 2016-2019

Ministers of Migration and Asylum 2020 - today

External links 
 Official site of the Ministry of Migration and Asylum:  migration.gov.gr
 European Union Agency for Asylum 
 International Organization for Migration
 European Migration Network (ΕΜΝ)
 Office of the United Nations High Commissioner for Refugees (UNHCR)
 United Nations International Children's Emergency Fund (UNICEF)
 EU Agency for Fundamental Rights

References 

Government ministries of Greece
Immigration ministers
Ministries established in 2020